Déogratias Nsanganiyumwami (born in 1963) is serving as the Minister of Infrastructures, Equipment and Social Housing in Burundi.

Background and education 
Nsanganiyumwami was born in 1963 in the province of Rutana Province, Burundi. He earned a Master’s Degree and a Doctorate’s Degree in veterinary medicine from a University in Bulgaria.

Career 
Nsanganiyumwami started practicing as a veterinary doctor in a private sector in 1998. Thereafter in 2002, he was employed as Provincial Veterinary Doctor in the Ministry of Agriculture and Livestock. Nsanganiyumwami later became the Head of the Department of Animal Health in Burundi.

References 

Living people
1963 births
Government ministers of Burundi
Burundian veterinarians